Ai FM (Chinese name: 爱 FM, literally "Love FM") is a Malaysian Mandarin-language radio station for Malaysian Chinese community operated by Radio Televisyen Malaysia. Established on 1 April 2005, it was previously known as the Chinese Language Service in 1946, the Green Network in 1959 and Radio 5 in 1993. Ai FM became a 24-hour radio station on 28 December 1994.

Frequency

Radio

Television

References

External links
 

1934 establishments in the Straits Settlements
Radio stations in Malaysia
Chinese-language radio stations in Malaysia
Radio Televisyen Malaysia